Muhammad Rashid Khan (born 26 October 1952) is a Pakistani athlete. He competed in the men's javelin throw at the 1984 Summer Olympics.

References

1952 births
Living people
Athletes (track and field) at the 1984 Summer Olympics
Pakistani male javelin throwers
Olympic athletes of Pakistan
Place of birth missing (living people)